Benz Pass is a narrow pass between the cliffs of Drenta Bluff in the southern extremity of Louis Philippe Plateau and Gigen Peak in the northwest part of the Erul Heights, situated  northeast of the head of Russell East Glacier, Trinity Peninsula. It was mapped from surveys by the Falkland Islands Dependencies Survey (1960–61), and named by the UK Antarctic Place-Names Committee for Karl Benz, a German engineer who constructed the first practical gasoline motor car in 1885.

Map
 Trinity Peninsula. Scale 1:250000 topographic map.  Institut für Angewandte Geodäsie and British Antarctic Survey, 1996.

References 

 SCAR Composite Antarctic Gazetteer.

Mountain passes of Trinity Peninsula